Taiwancylis is a genus of moths belonging to the family Tortricidae. It contains only one species, Taiwancylis cladodium, which is found in Taiwan.

The wingspan of the holotype, a male, is 11.5 mm.

See also
List of Tortricidae genera

References

Enarmoniini
Monotypic moth genera
Tortricidae genera
Moths of Taiwan
Endemic fauna of Taiwan
Moths described in 2000
Taxa named by Józef Razowski